SpellBrite is a light-emitting diode (LED) signage system that looks like neon but uses LEDs as its light source. The SpellBrite system consists of 44 letters, numbers and symbols that click together and are interchangeable, which allows a user to create a custom sign message and later reconfigure the sign to a different message.

History

SpellBrite was developed by iLight Technologies based on its Plexineon technology. SpellBrite signs are intended to simulate the look of neon signs, but use LEDs for longer life, more durability, lower energy usage, and lighter weight.

SpellBrite was named Best New Product at the ISA International Sign Expo which is organized by the International Sign Association, selected as Retailer Top Pick at the National Association of Convenience Stores (NACS) trade show which is run by the Association for Convenience Stores & Fuel Retailing, and was one of ten companies out of 562 to win at the Chicago Innovation Awards in 2013. The United States Patent and Trademark Office (USPTO) issued two patents for the SpellBrite signage system to iLight Technologies in 2014.

External links 
 SpellBrite
 iLight Technologies

References

Light-emitting diodes
Signage